Baby23 is the only studio album by American rapper JayDaYoungan. It was released on June 5, 2020, by RuffWayy Records and Atlantic Records. It features guest appearances by rappers Latto, Dej Loaf, Moneybagg Yo, and Kevin Gates. The album was supported by four singles: "23 Island", "Perky Activated", "38K", and "Touch Your Toes". It is the only studio album JayDaYoungan released during his lifetime, as he was shot and killed outside of his home on July 27, 2022.

Critical reception
AllMusic wrote that the album "balanced [JayDaYoungan's] aggressive, street-centric lyrics and bass-heavy production with some thoughtful introspection and moments incorporating acoustic guitar samples." In a posthumous review, Steve Juon of RapReviews.com wrote, "It’s clear from Baby23 that JayDaYoungan had the ambition to succeed and a sound that would easily fit into whatever "Power" or "Hot" FM radio station is big in your city." He named "Try Me", "Nightmares", and "23 Island" as highlights, writing, "In songs like 'Nightmares' we see that JayDaYoungan letting Javorius shine though, admitting that the constant hate directed his way was keeping him up at night more than Kid Cudi.

Track listing

Charts

References

2020 debut albums
Atlantic Records albums